The Arpa Valley is a high-altitude valley located in the south-west part of internal Tien-Shan. The valley is limited by Fergana Range to the south-west, the Torugart Range to the south, the Atbashy Range to the east, Ortok Too to the north-east, and Jaman-Too to the north. It is drained by the river Arpa, a tributary of the Ala-Buga. The elevation of the valley floor lies between 2600 and 3600 m. The road from Bishkek to the Torugart Pass passes trought the eastern part of the valley.

"From the top of the Sur-tash pass, on the Ferghana range, a most instructive view was obtained over the plateau world to the east. Below was the Arpa "Pamir," a broad, undulating, grassy valley, with the Arpa river flowing through its centre. The Jaman Davan range, which borders the Arpa plateau on the north-east, on the north closes in and joins with the Ferghana range, thus enclosing the plateau. The Arpa river cuts through this range by a deep-cut gorge, the course of which is still dotted on the map, by an imaginary line."

Footnotes

References
 Douglas Carruthers "Notes on the Journey to the Arpa and Ak-Sai Plateaus in Russian Turkestan." The Geographical Journal, Vol. 36, No. 5 (Nov., 1910), pp. 563-570.

Valleys of Kyrgyzstan
Naryn Region